The Y Service Station and Cafe, at 1733 Neptune Dr. in Clinton, Oklahoma, was built in 1937.  It was listed on the National Register of Historic Places in 2004.

It occupies a triangular property where Neptune Road splits in a "Y" with Route 66 diverging to the north and U.S. Highway 183 diverging to the south of the property.

A motel located to the south was destroyed in 1991 or 1992.

References

Gas stations in the United States
National Register of Historic Places in Custer County, Oklahoma
Mission Revival architecture in Oklahoma
Commercial buildings completed in 1937